The China TV Golden Eagle Award, commonly known in China as the Golden Eagle Awards, is one of three main national award ceremonies recognising excellence in the Chinese television industry. The award is presented by the China Television Artists Association. It is considered to be one of the most prestigious television awards, alongside the Feitian Awards and Magnolia Awards. The Golden Eagle Award is biennial, with the ceremony held on alternate years from the Feitian Awards since 2005.

History
Candidates used to be nominated by members of the China Television Artists Association (CTAA) and managers of local television stations. The nationwide audience would vote by filling in a form published in the Popular TV Magazine (大众电视), and the nominee with the most votes would clinch the top awards. Each category had three winning candidates, with the one having the highest number of votes clinching the "Best Award" (最佳奖) while the other two would each receive an "Outstanding Award" (优秀奖). If the nominee with the highest number of votes does not win more than 30% of the total share, the "Best Award" will not be given and instead all three nominees each will take an "Outstanding Award".

Since 2000 the awards ceremony has been held in Hunan province, and the awards ceremony has been preceded by the Golden Eagle TV Arts Festival, which was created by Hunan Television. The festival's awards include the Best Performing Arts Award, and the Most Popular Actor and Actress awards. The Best Performing Arts Award is given to the Audience's Choice nominee with the highest number of votes in the CTAA ballot, while the popularity awards are given at the end of the Golden Eagle Awards after several rounds of online voting.

The "Outstanding Award" for actor and actress categories was renamed to "Audience's Choice for Actor" or "Audience's Choice for Actress", and each category had about one to five nominees winning this award. There are three ballots - one for the judges, one for the members of the CTAA and one for the nationwide audience. The candidate who takes the most votes in the CTAA ballot wins the Best Performing Arts Actor or Actress award as well as the Audience's Choice Award, and is crowned Best Actor (视帝) or Actress (视后). The other candidates only win the Audience's Choice for Actor or Actress award.

In 2016, there was a major overhaul. The documentary and literary arts programme categories were cancelled, leaving only nine television award categories, and the Best Actor or Actress title have since been given exclusively to the winners who receive the Audience's Choice award.

In 2020, it was announced that a separate Best Actor award (最佳男/女演员) was created, and will be awarded based on polling from a panel of judges. Audience's Choice for Actor (观众喜爱的电视剧男演员) will be awarded based solely on three rounds of internet voting. For the first time, web dramas were also included in the list of nominations.

Categories

Golden Eagle Awards
 Best Television Series (最佳电视剧)
 Best Actor (最佳男演员)
 Best Actress (最佳女演员)
 Best Supporting Actor (最佳男配角)
 Best Supporting Actress (最佳女配角)
 Best Director (最佳导演)
 Best Screenwriter (最佳编剧)
 Best Cinematography (最佳摄影/摄像)
 Best Original Theme Song (最佳原创主题歌曲)
 Best Television Documentary (最佳电视纪录片)
 Best Television Program (最佳电视综艺节目)

Defunct categories
 Outstanding Television Series (优秀电视剧)
 Audience's Choice for Actor (观众喜爱的男演员)
 Audience's Choice for Actress (观众喜爱的女演员)
 Best Performing Arts Award (最佳表演艺术奖)
 Most Popular Actor (最具人气男演员)
 Most Popular Actress (最具人气女演员)
 Best Art Direction (最佳美术)
 Best Lighting (最佳灯光)
 Best Sound Recording (最佳录音)
 Best Television Documentary Director
 Best Literary Arts Programme (最佳电视文艺节目)
 Best Literary Arts Programme Director (最佳电视节目导演)
 Best Host (最佳主持人)
 Best Literary Arts Programme Art Direction
 Best Literary Arts Programme Cinematography

Golden Eagle Goddess
The Golden Eagle Goddess (Chinese name: 金鹰女神, 2006–present) was chosen by audience votes on the official poll. From 2016, the winner has been decided by a professional jury. The chosen actress gets to perform the opening act at the China Golden Eagle TV Art Festival, which precedes the actual awards ceremony.

See also 

 List of Asian television awards

References

External links

24th Annual Golden Eagle Awards official website

Chinese television awards
Awards established in 1983

1983 establishments in China
Biennial events